The 18625 / 18626 Kosi Express is an Express train belonging to South Eastern Railway zone that runs between  and  in India. It is currently being operated with 18625/18626 train numbers on a daily basis.

Service 

The 18625/Kosi Express has an average speed of 38 km/hr and covers 722 km in 18h 30m. The 18626/Kosi Express has an average speed of 37 km/hr and covers 722 km in 18h 40m.

Route & Halts

Coach composition

The train has standard ICF rakes with a max speed of 110 kmph. The train consists of 22 coaches:
 1 AC Second Tier Sleeper
 2 AC Three Tier Sleeper
 5 Sleeper
 1 Unreserved Chair Car
 11 General Unreserved
 2 Seating cum Luggage Rake

Traction 

Both trains are hauled by a Mughal Sarai-based WAP-4 or Gomoh-based WAP-7 electric locomotive from Hatia to  & vice versa.

Rake sharing

Previous, the train shares its rake with 18625/18626 Patna–Hatia Super Express, but now this train merged with Patna–Hatia Super Express.

Direction reversal 

The train reverses its direction 2 times:

See also 

 Durg Junction railway station
 Purnia Court railway station
 Patna–Hatia Super Express

Notes

References

External links 

 18625/Kosi Express India Rail Info
 18626/Kosi Express India Rail Info

Transport in Patna
Named passenger trains of India
Rail transport in Bihar
Rail transport in Odisha
Express trains in India